Sweden held a non-binding referendum on the introduction of the euro on 14 September 2003.

National results
Blank votes counted towards the net total. 5,719,240 ballots were cast for either yes or no, whereas a total of 5,840,313 votes counted towards the total.
Source: Valmyndigheten

Results by region

Parliamentary constituency results
Although blank votes, unlike in Riksdag elections counted towards the total, these tables only list yes and no votes, hence the total number being below 100%. Full results for blank votes are available at the Electoral Agency's website. While European Parliament elections are counted through counties, the nominal constituencies for the Riksdag extend to national referendums. Regardless, results were published both at constituency and county levels. "Votes" also denotes invalid ones.

Metropolitan counties
Three counties had multiple constituencies.

Municipal results

Blekinge

Dalarna

Gotland

Gävleborg

Halland

Jämtland

Jönköping

Kalmar

Kronoberg

Norrbotten

Skåne

Malmö

Skåne NE

Skåne S

Skåne W

Stockholm

Stockholm (city)

Stockholm County

Södermanland

Uppsala

Värmland

Västerbotten

Västernorrland

Västmanland

Västra Götaland

Gothenburg

Västra Götaland E

Västra Götaland N

Västra Götaland S

Västra Götaland W

Örebro

Östergötland

References

Referendums in Sweden